Stranraer Athletic Football Club was a football club from the town of Stranraer in Dumfries and Galloway, Scotland. They played in the South of Scotland League, although they announced that they would not participate in 2008–09 following the resignation of their manager and the failure to form a committee to run the club.

History
They were formed in 1995 as at the time it was felt by those who formed the club that Stranraer were fielding players based out with the town and not giving local players a chance to exhibit their talents. A crowd of 100 turned up for the club's first ever home game at Stranraer Academy Playing Fields, where the club continued to play their home matches. However this enthusiasm was not maintained and crowds were low. Nonetheless, the club proved quite successful in the South of Scotland League, which they joined upon their creation. They finished second in their inaugural season and between seasons 2002–03 and 2004–05 they won three consecutive league titles.

The team's strip (uniform) colours were the same as Stranraer FC, blue and white.

Honours

South of Scotland League

 Winners: 2002–03, 2003–04, 2004–05

Other Honours
Potts Cup: 1995–96, 2003–04, 2004–05
Haig Gordon Memorial Trophy: 1996–97, 2004–05
South of Scotland League Cup: 2003–04

References

Football clubs in Scotland
Football clubs in Dumfries and Galloway
Association football clubs established in 1995
Association football clubs disestablished in 2008
1995 establishments in Scotland
2008 disestablishments in Scotland
Stranraer
South of Scotland Football League teams